Clarington Central Secondary School (also known as CCSS) is a public secondary school located in Bowmanville, Ontario, Canada, within the Kawartha Pine Ridge District School Board. The school includes Grades 7-12. 

Clarington Central Secondary School opened in September 2005 to students and was later officially opened by Kawartha Pine Ridge District School Board officials and the former Mayor of Clarington John Mutton in November 2005. 

CCSS is well-known for its Arts programming, and in particular its vibrant musical theatre program. Many students from this program have gone on to successful careers in theatre, film, and television. The school was the stage of LaMira Rose Theatre Collective’s original show Concealer in August, 2019. The founder of the collective is Candice Russell, a member of CCSS alumni.

See also
List of high schools in Ontario

References

Educational institutions established in 2005
High schools in the Regional Municipality of Durham
Buildings and structures in Clarington
2005 establishments in Ontario